The following are 'lists of animated films

By award
Academy Award for Best Animated Feature
Academy Award for Best Animated Short Film
Annie Award for Best Animated Feature
Asia Pacific Screen Award for Best Animated Feature Film
BAFTA Award for Best Animated Film
César Award for Best Animated Film
European Film Award for Best Animated Feature Film
Golden Globe Award for Best Animated Feature Film
Golden Rooster Award for Best Animation
Goya Award for Best Animated Film
Hundred Flowers Award for Best Animation
Japan Academy Prize for Animation of the Year
Mainichi Film Award for Best Animation Film
Ōfuji Noburō Award
Satellite Award for Best Animated or Mixed Media Feature
Saturn Award for Best Animated Film

By country
Albanian
Argentinian
Australian
Belgium
Brazilian
British
Canadian
Chilean
Chinese
Czech
Danish
Estonian
French
German
Hungarian
Indian
Irish
Italian
Japanese
Korean
Malaysian
Mexican
Norwegian
Pakistani
Philippines
Russian
Singaporean
South African
Spanish
Swedish
Ukrainian
Vietnamese

By decadeNote: Only feature films.Before 1940
1940s
1950s
1960s
1970s
1980s
1990s
2000s
2010s
2020s

By length
Feature
Short

By studio
Walt Disney Studios
List of Disney theatrical animated features 
List of Disney feature-length home entertainment releases
20th Century Studios (Blue Sky Studios) (Unproduced)
Walt Disney Animation Studios (Unproduced) (Short)
Pixar (Shorts) (SparkShorts)
List of Disney live-action adaptations and remakes of Disney animated films
List of films based on Marvel Comics publications
The Weinstein Company
List of The Weinstein Company animated films
NBCUniversal
List of Universal Pictures theatrical animated features (Unproduced) 
List of Universal Animation Studios productions
Illumination
DreamWorks Animation (Unproduced)
List of VeggieTales videos
Laika (company)
List of Laika theatrical animated feature films
MGM Holdings
List of Metro-Goldwyn-Mayer theatrical animated features
List of one-shot Metro-Goldwyn-Mayer animated shorts
List of Metro-Goldwyn-Mayer cartoon studio films
Tom and Jerry filmography
Lionsgate
List of Lionsgate theatrical animated feature films
Netflix
List of Netflix Animation theatrical animated feature films
Paramount Global
List of Paramount Pictures theatrical animated features
Nickelodeon
Cartoon Saloon
List of Cartoon Saloon theatrical animated feature films
Sony Pictures Entertainment
List of Sony theatrical animated features (Unproduced)
Aardman Animations
List of Aardman theatrical animated feature films
Warner Bros. Discovery 
List of Warner Bros. theatrical animated features (Unproduced) 
Warner Animation Group
Cartoon Network
List of films based on Hanna-Barbera cartoons
List of films based on DC Comics publications
Looney Tunes and Merrie Melodies filmography
List of Scooby-Doo media
Studio Ghibli
List of Ghibli theatrical animated feature films
Short films by Studio Ghibli

By technique
Computer-animated
Flash-animated
Stop-motion
List of films with live action and animation
List of puppet films

By yearNote: Only feature films.''

1970
1971
1972
1973
1974
1975
1976
1977
1978
1979
1980
1981
1982
1983
1984
1985
1986
1987
1988
1989
1990
1991
1992
1993
1994
1995
1996
1997
1998
1999 
2000
2001
2002
2003
2004
2005
2006
2007
2008
2009
2010
2011
2012
2013
2014
2015
2016
2017
2018
2019
2020
2021
2022
2023

Other
Films with live action and animation
List of adult animated films
List of animated films in the public domain in the United States
List of animated package films
List of animated short series
List of highest-grossing animated films
List of lost or unfinished animated films
 List of highest-grossing live-action/animated films
 List of animated films by box office admissions